The 1910–11 Georgia Bulldogs basketball team represents the University of Georgia during the 1910–11 college men's basketball season. The team captain of the 1910–11 season was Tillou Forbes.

Schedule

|-

References

Georgia Bulldogs basketball seasons
Georgia
Bulldogs
Bulldogs